Cesar Manhilot (born August 1, 1962), known professionally as Cesar Montano, is a Filipino actor, film producer and film director.

Montano started in show business as a commercial model. He played roles in numerous B movies. He then played major roles in several action movies and a brief television career playing the lead role in the television sitcom Kaya ni Mister, Kaya ni Misis. One of his best-known roles is his portrayal of the titular patriot José Rizal in the film José Rizal (1998). He starred in the war film The Great Raid (2005), his first Hollywood film.

Montano has won numerous acting awards in Panaghoy sa Suba ("The Call of the River"), José Rizal, Muro Ami ("Reef Hunters") and Bagong Buwan ("New Moon").

Aside from acting, Montano also embarked on a singing career, with the release of his music album Subok lang or Just try in 2000.  He has also ventured into film production as well as directing, with Panaghoy sa Suba as his directorial film debut.

In May 2007, he unsuccessfully ran for Senate under the coalition TEAM Unity (TU). GMA News reported that he lost about P40 million worth of endorsement for running in public office. Montano also lost the 2010 Gubernatorial race in his home province of Bohol.

On July 13, 2010, Montano officially became a contract artist of GMA Network after signing a two-year exclusive contract with the said network. In 2012, he left GMA 7 for TV5's Artista Academy.

In 2016, Montano was running as the 2nd nominee of Aangat Tayo party-list in the 2016 national elections, but subsequently lost. In the same year, he was appointed by Tourism Secretary Wanda Corazon Teo as the Chief Operation Officer of the Tourism Promotions Board.

Biography and career
Montano, known by his nickname Buboy, was born and raised in Santa Ana, Manila, Philippines. His paternal side traces its roots to the Manhilots of Baclayon, a town in Bohol.

Early work
Montano became interested in acting while studying in college. He acted in stage productions at the University of the Philippines and joined acting workshops in between. Among his notable plays is Esteromenggoles. He also worked as a stuntman early in his career.

He auditioned for Ishmael Bernal's Student Body under Regal Films, in which he became among the top 3 leading men. Unfortunately, the project didn't push through. He was later discovered by Robbie Tan, who made him a talent of the now-defunct Seiko Films. He initially bagged supporting roles in action films and leading men roles in drama films. In 1990, he starred in his first two movies Kasalanan ang Buhayin Ka and Machete. After leaving Seiko in mid-1992, he starred in several films under Viva Films and its subsidiary Neo Films.

Montano is known for his collaboration with the late Toto Natividad, who directed his movies Leonardo Delos Reyes: Alyas Waway (1993), Utol (1996), Biláng na ang Araw mo (1996), Pusakal (1997), Sanggano (1997), Kasangga Kahit Kelan (1998), Warfreak (1998), and Type Kita Walang Kokontra (1999).

He played national hero José Rizal in the historical biopic José Rizal in 1998. In 1999 film Muro Ami, he played Fredo, the boss of child laborers in the illegal fishing industry. The film won thirteen awards at the 1999 Metro Manila Film Festival.

Directing
Montano's early directions were an episode of Mikee in 1995, in which he starred in, and the 1998 film Warfreak, in which he co-directed with Natividad and starred as the titular character. In 1999, Montano marked his directorial debut with Bullet, in which he co-wrote and starred as the titular character, an autistic person with a special skill in marksmanship. The same goes for the 2001 film Mananabas, where he stars as the leader of a lost command.

Montano produced, directed and starred in the 2004 film Panaghoy sa Suba, which was his entry to the 2004 Metro Manila Film Festival. It is set during World War II, and the story takes place mostly along the Loboc River in Bohol. It was filmed mostly in the Visayan language with an almost exclusively Visayan cast. It was given an "A" rating by the Cinema Evaluation Board or CEB of the Film Development Council of the Philippines, which described the film as "a poetic, sometimes even magical, current of silent struggle and survival."

Panaghoy sa Suba won multiple awards. It collected Second Best Picture (to Mano Po III: My Love), Best Director, Best Supporting Actress, Best Screenplay, Best Cinematography, Best Musical Score and the Gatpuno Villegas Cultural Award at the Metro Manila Film Festival, 2004; and Best Actor, Best Supporting Actress at Gawad Suri Awards, Manila, 2005. Aside from garnering 16 awards and 11 nominations including 5 from, it was also given an endorsement by the UNESCO.  It was named Best Picture at the International Festival of Independent Films held in Brussels, Belgium. Montano was also chosen Best Director. In addition, Montano also won Best Actor in Panaghoy sa Suba in the Golden Screen Awards. Panaghoy sa Suba was invited as an exhibition in the Tous les cinémas du Monde (Movies of the World) at the Cannes Film Festival in 2005. It has also been invited for exhibition in other international film festivals in Berlin, Toronto, Tokyo, Korea and in the Czech Republic’s Karlo Vary Film Festival.

Hollywood
In 2002, American film director and screenwriter John Dahl cast Montano in The Great Raid after taking notice of Montano's performance in the movie Muro Ami as well as an extensive open call audition and series of callbacks in Manila. He played Juan Pajota in the Miramax Film set in Cabanatuan, Nueva Ecija, Philippines, in 1945 during World War II. The film was shot mostly in Australia and partly in China.

Montano was cast in another U.S. film, Another Deep Breath, scheduled to start shooting in the San Francisco Bay Area in March 2005. Funding was never secured so the production never started shooting.

Music career
From 1981 to 1982, Montano was a regular performer at Hotel Mirador.

On  1 January 2000, Montano released his first music solo album entitled "Subok Lang" (Just Try) under Star Records. On nine of the album's ten songs he is accompanied only by an acoustic guitar. He sings a duet on the second version "Kailan Ko Lang Sinabi" (When I Just Told You) with his wife, Sunshine Cruz, who is also a Filipino actress and recording artist. Subok lang went on to become Platinum record.

Political career

Cesar Montano ran for a senate position under Lakas–Kampi–CMD in the 2007 elections and lost. On May 19, 2009, he was appointed by then-president Gloria Macapagal Arroyo as her Presidential Special Envoy for Film and Digital Cinema, a newly created position accorded ambassador rank and given diplomatic status by the Department of Foreign Affairs. He then again attempted to be involved in politics on October 13, 2009, when he filed his candidacy for governor in his home province Bohol. He lost the 2010 local election for the governor position.

Personal life

Montano is fluent in both Tagalog and Cebuano, and speaks his ancestral Boholano dialect. He is the fifth of seven children born to a lawyer father and mother that belonged to the Seventh-day Adventist Church. Montano describes his father as a strict disciplinarian, and his mother imposing her religion's prohibitions against pork and movies. He attended Santa Ana Elementary School and Mariano Marcos Memorial High School, finishing Mass Communication at Lyceum of the Philippines University in Intramuros, Manila.

Montano was first married to Marilyn Polinga, a fellow Boholano he met at a local Seventh-day Adventist church. Montano then worshipped at the Bread of Life Ministries International evangelical church in Quezon City, before becoming a congregant at Christ's Commission Fellowship in Mandaluyong together with his second wife, Sunshine Cruz, and his children. Polinga, with whom he had two children, died in 1993. Their second child, Christian Angelo Manhilot, died at the age of 23 on March 26, 2010, from a self-inflicted gunshot wound to the head at their house in Quezon City.

His son with actress Teresa Loyzaga, Carlos Diego Loyzaga, lived with his mother in Australia, and has returned to the Philippines as an exclusive contract actor with ABS-CBN.

Montano married Sunshine Cruz on September 14, 2000, in a Christian wedding. They have three daughters, Angelina Isabelle, Samantha Angeline and Angel Francheska. He filed for annulment of marriage with Cruz, which was finally granted on August 26, 2013. Aside from his farm in Pandi, Bulacan, Montano also owns an Italian restaurant located in Quezon City.

Cesar Montano has rejoined the Seventh-day Adventist Church.

Filmography

Discography

Awards

References

External links
 
 Cesar Montano in BIKTIMA Manila Times

1962 births
Living people
21st-century Filipino male singers
ABS-CBN personalities
Boholano people
Duterte administration personnel
Filipino actor-politicians
Filipino film directors
Filipino male comedians
Filipino Seventh-day Adventists
Former evangelicals
GMA Network personalities
Lyceum of the Philippines University alumni
Male actors from Bohol
Male actors from Manila
People from Santa Ana, Manila
Singers from Bohol
Singers from Manila
Tagalog-language singers
TV5 (Philippine TV network) personalities